Mabatini is an administrative ward in the Mbeya Urban district of the Mbeya Region of Tanzania. In 2016 the Tanzania National Bureau of Statistics report there were 8,172 people in the ward, from 7,415 in 2012.

Neighborhoods 
The ward has 6 neighborhoods.
 Kajigili
 Kisunga
 Mabatini
 Mianzini
 Senjele
 Simike

References 

Wards of Mbeya Region